"Baby's Got a New Baby" is a song written by J. Fred Knobloch and Dan Tyler, and recorded by American country music group S-K-O.  It was released in December 1986 as the second single from the album Schuyler, Knobloch & Overstreet.  The song was S-K-O's second country hit and the group's only number one on the country chart.  The single went to number one for one week and spent a total of fourteen weeks within the top 40.

Charts

Weekly charts

Year-end charts

References

1986 singles
S-K-O songs
Songs written by J. Fred Knobloch
Song recordings produced by James Stroud
MTM Records singles
1986 songs
Songs written by Dan Tyler